"Da Game Been Good to Me" is the only single from UGK's final studio album UGK 4 Life. The song was released onto the Internet on January 16, 2009 and on iTunes February 20, 2009.

Music video

The music video was released on March 30, 2009, the day before the album's release. The music video features past videos of UGK, director's cuts of videos and mash ups of them. There are flashes of those videos, as well as bash paper showing pictures of UGK and reading the lyrics in fancy fonts.

Chart positions

References

2009 singles
UGK songs
2009 songs
Jive Records singles